Indigofera australis, the Australian indigo or Austral indigo, is an attractive species of leguminous shrub in the genus Indigofera (family Fabaceae). The genus name Indigofera is Neo-Latin for "bearing Indigo" (Indigo is a purple dye originally obtained from some Indigofera species). Australis, from the Latin, means not “Australian” but "southern", referring to the geographical distribution of the species.

Description 
Its natural habit is upright, to 2 m (7 ft) high, with flexible stems. The leaves are pinnate, openly spaced on the stems, around 10 cm long and velvety smooth to the touch. The flower color is unusual, ranging through soft purple hues, often pinkish and a change from other species flowering at the same time. The flowers are smooth, in short spires in the leaf axils, freely produced and showy, outlining the curves of the stems. They may open at any time from mid-September and may continue till November in a cool spring.

It can regrow and sucker from rootstocks and lateral roots after fire.

Distribution 
A very common and widespread species in Australia, Indigofera australis grows in a variety of different habitats, mainly open woodland and eucalypt forest, but also in desert and in the margins of rainforest. It is widespread in southern Australia from the southeastern Western Australia to northeastern Queensland.

Habitat value 
It is an excellent habitat plant for wildlife. The flowers are a pollen and nectar source for many native insects, including bees and wasps. The plant is a useful food plant for butterfly larvae (caterpillars):
 Freyeria trochylus – "Grass Jewel"
 Eurema hecabe – "Common Grass Yellow"
 Lampides boeticus – "Long-tailed Pea Blue"
 Zizina labradus – "Common Grass-blue"

Uses 
The attractive flowers, and the plants adaptability to grow in different situations make it suitable as an ornamental plant in Australia.

The Australian aborigines crushed the leaves and added these to water to kill or stun fish and eels.

The leaves and stems produce yellow-fawn dye with alum as mordant.

References

External links

 Indigofera australis on Plant Net (retrieved September 18, 2009)
 Indigofera australis

australis
Flora of New South Wales
Flora of Queensland
Flora of South Australia
Flora of Tasmania
Flora of Victoria (Australia)
Flora of Western Australia
Garden plants
Drought-tolerant plants